Addie and Hermy - The Nasty Nazis was a British comic strip series created by Sam Fair, which appeared in the magazine The Dandy from 1939 until 1941. It was published by the Dundee-based publishing-firm DC Thomson and Co.

The comic strip starred caricatures of Adolf Hitler and Hermann Göring, using typical German stereotypes and speech to portray the characters. The BBC states that they were 'usually embroiled in a scam that went wrong'. It was part of the British war time propaganda during World War II. A similar comic by the same publishing firm poked fun at Benito Mussolini and was called Musso the Wop.

References

Dandy strips
British comic strips
1939 comics debuts
Comics characters introduced in 1939
1941 comics endings
Gag-a-day comics
Satirical comics
Comic strip duos
Cultural depictions of Adolf Hitler
Cultural depictions of Hermann Göring
Comics about Nazi Germany
Comics set in the 1930s
Comics set in the 1940s
DC Thomson Comics characters
Male characters in comics
Comic strips based on real people
Fictional Nazis